Jadir Morgenstern (born 29 May 1974), or simply Jadir, is a football manager and former player who is the manager of Brazilian club Toledo U19.

Born in Brazil, Jadir is of Lebanese descent; he represented Lebanon internationally at the 2000 AFC Asian Cup as a centre-back.

Club career
Jadir started his professional career at Toledo, being sold to Atlético Paranaense for the 1993 Campeonato Brasileiro Série A in which his team was relegated. After spending another year at Furacão, he spent the next years being loaned to lower clubs. In 1996, he won the Campeonato Mato-Grossense with Mixto, playing in the final. In 1998, playing for Tubarão, he won the Copa Santa Catarina.

In 2000, he moved to Lebanese club Al-Ansar, later being naturalized and making his debut for Lebanon later in the year. He spent the rest of his career at the Asian country, except for a brief spell at Juventude-MT, playing also for Hekmeh FC and Akhaa Ahli Aley before ending his career at Al-Ansar.

International career
Jadir represented Lebanon at the 2000 AFC Asian Cup and the World Cup 2002 Qualifying.

Managerial career
Jadir coaches the Toledo under-19 team, a position he holds since 2014.

Personal life 
Jadir's brother, Jorge, was also a professional footballer having played most for Paraná-based clubs. Jadir has a son, Adriel, who also plays football.

See also
 List of Lebanon international footballers born outside Lebanon
 List of association football families

References

External links
 
 
 

1974 births
Living people
Sportspeople from Paraná (state)
Brazilian footballers
Brazilian people of Lebanese descent
Brazilian emigrants to Lebanon
Sportspeople of Lebanese descent
Citizens of Lebanon through descent
Lebanese footballers
Association football defenders
Lebanese Premier League players
toledo Esporte Clube players
Club Athletico Paranaense players
mixto Esporte Clube players
Sociedade Esportiva Recreativa e Cultural Brasil players
rio Branco Sport Club players
iraty Sport Club players
Sagesse SC footballers
Akhaa Ahli Aley FC players
Al Ansar FC players
Lebanon international footballers
2000 AFC Asian Cup players
Brazilian football managers
Lebanese football managers